Vladimir Anatolyevich Novikov (born 4 August 1970 in Alma Ata, Kazakh SSR) is a retired Soviet gymnast. He competed at the 1988 Summer Olympics in all artistic gymnastics events and won a gold medal with the Soviet team. Individually his best result was sixth place on the parallel bars. He won two more gold medals with the Soviet team at the world championships in 1987 and 1989.

After retirement from competitions he coached gymnastics at the Woodward Gymnastics Camp in the United States, together with Vitaly Shcherbo.

References

1970 births
Living people
Soviet male artistic gymnasts
Gymnasts at the 1988 Summer Olympics
Olympic gymnasts of the Soviet Union
Olympic gold medalists for the Soviet Union
Olympic medalists in gymnastics
Kazakhstani male artistic gymnasts
Medalists at the 1988 Summer Olympics
Medalists at the World Artistic Gymnastics Championships